Wilson Eyre House is a historic residence located in the Washington Square West neighborhood of Philadelphia, Pennsylvania. It was built between 1830 and 1835, and is a three-story brick dwelling with a low to medium roof and dormer.  A three-story brick addition was added in 1909 by its then owner, architect Wilson Eyre (1858-1944).  Eyre purchased the home in 1909, and occupied it until his death in 1944.

The house was added to the National Register of Historic Places in 1977.

References

External links
Wilson Eyre house at the Historic American Buildings Survey

Houses completed in 1909
Houses on the National Register of Historic Places in Philadelphia
Houses in Philadelphia
Washington Square West, Philadelphia